James Palmes  (1826–1898) was the Archdeacon of the East Riding from 1892  until his death.

Palmes was educated at University College, Durham and ordained in 1850. After a curacy in Leeds he held incumbencies at Weeton and Escrick.

He died on 3 June 1898.

References

1826 births
19th-century English Anglican priests
Alumni of University College, Durham
Archdeacons of the East Riding
1898 deaths